Everybody Needs Love is the third album by Gladys Knight & the Pips and their first album for Motown Records' Soul imprint. The LP, chiefly produced by Norman Whitfield, features the singles "Just Walk in My Shoes" (the 1966 group's Motown debut), "Take Me in Your Arms and Love Me", "Everybody Needs Love" and "I Heard It Through the Grapevine".

"Everybody Needs Love", which peaked at number 39 on the Billboard Hot 100, was Knight & the Pips first major Motown hit, but "Grapevine", which peaked at number 2, was a major success for the group and Motown. Selling over 2.5 million copies, "I Heard It Through the Grapevine" became Motown's best-selling single to that point. Its success would be overshadowed by Marvin Gaye's version of the song, which would be issued on Motown's Tamla label a year after Knight & the Pips' recording.

Track listing

Charts

Singles

Personnel
 Gladys Knight - lead vocals
 Merald "Bubba" Knight, William Guest, Edward Patten - backing vocals
 The Andantes - backing vocals on "Just Walk in My Shoes"
 The Funk Brothers - instrumentation

References

External links
Everybody Needs Love at Discogs

1967 debut albums
Gladys Knight & the Pips albums
Motown albums
Albums produced by Norman Whitfield
Albums produced by Johnny Bristol
Albums produced by Smokey Robinson
Albums produced by Harvey Fuqua